Michael James Gardiner (born October 19, 1965) is a Canadian former Major League Baseball pitcher who played for the Seattle Mariners, Boston Red Sox, Montreal Expos, and Detroit Tigers. He was a switch hitter and threw right-handed.

Career
Gardiner was drafted by the Seattle Mariners in the 18th round (448th) of the 1987 Major League Baseball Draft out of Indiana State University. He signed June 6, 1987. He reached the Majors on September 8, .

In his college career, Gardiner led Indiana State to the College World Series; he currently holds the career wins record (30) for the Sycamores, he's #2 in strikeouts (296) and #5 in complete games (16).  He was a member of the Canadian Olympic Team for the 1984 Olympics and the 1985 Intercontinental Cup.

In a six-year major league career, Gardiner posted 17 wins, 27 losses, and a career 5.21 ERA in 136 career games.  He spent a total of 12 seasons in the minors, posting a W/L record of 61–42, 3.97, 11 Saves and an ERA of 3.45. He was the Eastern League Pitcher of the Year in 1990.

Gardiner now lives in Charlotte, North Carolina and has one son named Eric. He also is the owner/manager of the Charlotte Stealth Baseball Organization (Travel baseball for players 9U up to 17U).

References

External links

Mike Gardiner at SABR (Baseball BioProject)   
1965 births 
Living people 
Baseball people from Ontario 
Baseball players at the 1984 Summer Olympics 
Bellingham Mariners players 
Boston Red Sox players 
Canadian expatriate baseball players in the United States 
Charlotte Knights players 
Columbus Clippers players 
Detroit Tigers players 
Indiana State Sycamores baseball players 
Major League Baseball pitchers 
Major League Baseball players from Canada 
Montreal Expos players 
New Orleans Zephyrs players 
Norfolk Tides players 
Olympic baseball players of Canada 
Ottawa Lynx players 
Pawtucket Red Sox players 
Seattle Mariners players 
Sportspeople from Sarnia 
Toledo Mud Hens players 
Wausau Timbers players 
Williamsport Bills players